This is a chronological list of philosophers of science. For an alphabetical name-list, see :Category:Philosophers of science.

Before the 19th century
 Roger Bacon
 Sir Francis Bacon
 Galileo Galilei

19th century
 Auguste Comte
 William Whewell
 George Henry Lewes
 William Stanley Jevons
 Ernst Mach
 Charles Sanders Peirce
 Edmund Husserl
 Frederich Engels

1900–1930
 Nikola Tesla
 Henri Poincaré
 Pierre Duhem
 Niels Bohr
 Albert Einstein
 Bertrand Russell
 Frank P. Ramsey
 Moritz Schlick
 John Dewey
 Alfred North Whitehead

1930–1960
 Alfred Ayer
 Mario Bunge
 Hans Reichenbach
 Georges Canguilhem
 Noam Chomsky
 Kenneth Craik
 Alexandre Koyré
 Sir Karl Popper
 Rudolf Carnap
 Michael Polanyi
 Otto Neurath
 Carl Gustav Hempel
 Paul Oppenheim
 Gaston Bachelard
 R. B. Braithwaite
 Werner Heisenberg
 Taketani Mitsuo
 Stephen Toulmin

1960–1980
 David Bloor
 David Bohm
 Paul Feyerabend
 Mary Hesse
 Thomas Kuhn
 Imre Lakatos
 Ernest Nagel
 Hilary Putnam
 W.V. Quine
 Michael Ruse
 Carl Friedrich von Weizsäcker

1980–present
 Peter Achinstein
 David Albert
 Jeffrey A. Barrett
 Roy Bhaskar
 Maarten Boudry
 Richard Boyd
 Arturo Carsetti
Nancy Cartwright
David Castle
 Anjan Chakravartty
 Alan Chalmers
 Hasok Chang
 Patricia Churchland
 Paul Churchland
 Daniel Dennett
 John Dupré
 John Earman
 Bas van Fraassen
 Ronald Giere
 Peter Godfrey-Smith
 Rebecca Goldstein
 Adolf Grünbaum
 Susan Haack
 Ian Hacking
 Donna Haraway
 Sandra Harding
 Michał Heller
 Jaakko Hintikka
 Paul Hoyningen-Huene
 Philip Kitcher
 Ursula Klein
 Larry Laudan
 John Lennox
 Isaac Levi
 Peter Lipton
 Helen Longino
 Elisabeth Lloyd
 Tim Maudlin
 Deborah Mayo
 Ernan McMullin
 Peter Medawar
 Sandra Mitchell
 John E. Murdoch
 Nancey Murphy
 Basarab Nicolescu
 Massimo Pigliucci
 John Polkinghorne
 Stathis Psillos
 Alexander Rosenberg
 Oliver Sacks
 Wesley C. Salmon
 Eric Scerri
 Kristin Shrader-Frechette
 Lawrence Sklar
 Brian Skyrms
 Quentin Smith
 Elliott Sober
 Wolfgang Stegmüller
 Kim Sterelny
 David Stove
 Patrick Suppes
 Claudine Tiercelin
 Roberto Torretti
 John Worrall

Science